The Electric House is a 1922 American short comedy film co-directed by and starring Buster Keaton.

Plot
Three graduating students drop their degree certificates, but each picks up the wrong ones off the floor.  Keaton plays a botany student who, accidentally, picked up an electrical engineering degree and is invited to wire a home using many gadgets.  The man who actually was the electrical engineer graduate exacts revenge by rewiring those gadgets to cause mayhem.

Cast
 Buster Keaton as himself
 Virginia Fox as Girl (uncredited)
 Joe Keaton as Extra (uncredited)
 Louise Keaton as Extra (uncredited)
 Myra Keaton as Extra (uncredited)
 Joe Roberts as Homeowner (uncredited)

Production
During the original scheduled shooting of the film in 1920, Keaton suffered a broken ankle filming a sequence with the electric staircase. The project was shelved, and then re-done entirely. The known version today is actually the second version filmed; no copies of the original footage from 1920 are known to exist.

See also
 Buster Keaton filmography

References

External links

 The Electric House at the International Buster Keaton Society

1922 films
1922 comedy films
1922 short films
American silent short films
Silent American comedy films
American black-and-white films
1920s English-language films
Films directed by Buster Keaton
Films directed by Edward F. Cline
Films produced by Joseph M. Schenck
Films with screenplays by Buster Keaton
Articles containing video clips
1920s American films